The 2022–23 Alabama A&M Bulldogs basketball team represented Alabama A&M University in the 2022–23 NCAA Division I men's basketball season. The Bulldogs, led by first-year head coach Otis Hughley Jr., played their home games at the newly opened Alabama A&M Events Center in Huntsville, Alabama as members of the Southwestern Athletic Conference.

Previous season
The Bulldogs finished the 2021–22 season 12–18, 10–8 in SWAC play to finish in fifth place. In the SWAC tournament, they defeated Florida A&M, before falling to Alcorn State in the semifinals. On March 22, Alabama A&M announced that they were parting ways with head coach Dylan Howard after five season as the head coach. On April 18, the school announced that Otis Hughley Jr. would be named the next head coach of the Bulldogs.

Roster

Schedule and results

|-
!colspan=12 style=| Exhibition

|-
!colspan=12 style=| Non-conference regular season

|-
!colspan=12 style=| SWAC regular season

|-
!colspan=9 style=| SWAC tournament

Sources

References

Alabama A&M Bulldogs basketball seasons
Alabama AandM Bulldogs
Alabama AandM Bulldogs basketball
Alabama AandM Bulldogs basketball